Theodora (c. 870 – 916) was a senatrix and serenissima vestaratrix of Rome. Theodora was married to Theophylact I, Count of Tusculum. The couple shared effective rulership of Rome between 905 and her death in 916. 

Her daughter, Marozia, was the alleged concubine to Pope Sergius III, and mother of Pope John XI. The latter, according to Liutprand of Cremona and the Liber Pontificalis, was fathered by Sergius.  However, the annalist Flodoard (c. 894–966), a direct contemporary of Theodora's, says John XI was the brother of Count Alberic II of Spoleto. Because Alberic II was Marozia's son by her husband Count Alberic I of Spoleto, John was likely the son of Marozia and Alberic I.

Theodora was characterized by the aforementioned Liutprand as a "shameless whore ... [who] exercised power on the Roman citizenry like a man".   Liutprand, a bishop of Cremona, was known to his contemporaries and modern historians as being unfair to adversaries.

General bibliography 
 E. Dümmler, Auxilius u. Vulgarius. Quellen und Forschungen zur Geschichte des Papsttums im Anfange des zehnten Jahrhunderts, Leipzig 1866, pp. 12–26;
 P. Fedele, Ricerche per la storia di Roma e del papato al secolo X, in "Archivio della Società Romana di Storia Patria", 33, 1910, pp. 177–247; 34, 1911, pp. 75–115 e 393–423;
 L. Duchesne, Serge III. et Jean XI., in "Mélanges d'archéologie et d'histoire", 33 (1913), pp. 25–64
 Ferdinand Gregorovius, Storia di Roma nel medioevo, New Compton Editori Srl, Roma 1972
 Lexikon des Mittelalters, München 2002

Citations

External links 
 "Liutprand of Cremona" in the Catholic Encyclopedia

Papal mistresses
People of medieval Rome
Women and the papacy
10th-century Italian women
10th-century Italian nobility
870 births
916 deaths
Year of birth uncertain